This is the complete list of (physical and digital) number-one singles sold in Finland in 2007 according to the Official Finnish Charts. The list on the left side of the box (Suomen virallinen singlelista, "the Official Finnish Singles Chart") represents both physical and digital track sales and the one on the right side (Suomen virallinen latauslista, "the Official Finnish Download Chart") represents sales of digital tracks.

NB! The digital downloads have been tracked for charts since week 5 of 2007. From week 40 onwards, they have also counted towards the singles chart.

Chart history

See also
List of number-one albums of 2007 (Finland)

References

Number-one hits
Finland
2007